The Return of Wong Fei Hung is a 1984 Hong Kong martial arts television series produced by TVB and starring Andy Lau. Despite Wong Fei-hung being part of the English title, Wong is only a supporting character in the series while the protagonist is his famed disciple Lam Sai-wing, portrayed by Lau. The Cantonese title is "Po Chi Lam", the name of Wong's famed medicine clinic.

Plot
Lam Sai-wing (Andy Lau), a butcher who makes a living with his older sister by selling pork in Guangzhou. He and his childhood friend Au-yeung Ching-ching (Yammie Lam) go on to develop romantic feelings for one another. Later Sai-wing also meets Leung Foon (Stephen Tung), Buckteeth So (Liu Wai-hung), Wong Chun-yee (Joseph Lee) and Wong's father: Grandmaster Wong Fei-hung (Lau Kong). As a martial arts fanatic, Sai-wing have always idolized Master Wong and together with So and Foon, Sai-wing decides to formally be Wong's apprentice.

After becoming Wong's apprentice, Sai-wing becomes indulged with martial arts and neglects Ching-ching. At this time, Ching-ching also meets a talented man named Nap-lan Ching-tak (Kent Tong) and they two of them fall in love. When Sai-wing tries to confess his love to Ching-ching once again, it was already too late since Ching has decided to marry Ching-tak. After some twist and turns, Sai-wing finally touches Ching-ching's heart with his sincerity but also attracting the jealousy and hatred of Ching-tak. At this time, Ching-tak plans to exact revenge on Sai-wing and the people around him.

Cast

Andy Lau as Lam Sai-wing (林世榮), nicknamed Porky Wing (豬肉榮) due to his occupation as a pork butcher, a martial arts fanatic and prodigy who was initially trained by his father, but when his father was killed in a fight because of his poor temper, Sai-wing's blind elder sister, Sai-yuk, forbidden him to practice martial arts, not wanting him to follow their father's footstep. When Wong Fei-hung notices Sai-wing's talent, Wong manages to convince his sister to allow Sai-wing to become his disciple.
Stephen Tung as Leung Foon (梁寬), the lead coach of Sanshui's local militia who moves Guangzhou to live with his uncle, Kwai and becomes friends with Sai-wing. He is a talented martial artist, but is arrogant and Wong initially denied his request to take him as a disciple, but after Foon learns his lesson after being framed for murder, Wong officially accepts him.
Kent Tong as Nap-lan Ching-tak (納蘭正德), the son of a rich Manchurian businessman from Guangxi who is multi-talented in literature, music and martial arts. He falls in love with Sai-wing's childhood sweetheart Ching-ching and marries her, but is still very jealous of Sai-wing to the point he tries to kill to latter.
Yammie Lam as Au-yeung Ching-ching (歐陽菁菁), Sai-wing's childhood sweetheart who is the daughter of a fallen official. Despite her love for Sai-wing, he often neglects her in favor for martial arts and ends up marrying Nap-lan to help her family out of poverty.
Lau Kong as Wong Fei-hung (黃飛鴻), a well-respected grand master of Hung Ga Kung Fu and physician who owns the clinic, Po Chi Lam (寶芝林). Honorable and benevolent, Wong often solves problem using virtue even when dealing with rivals.
Liu Wai-hung as So Sai-choi (蘇世財), nicknamed Buckteeth So (牙擦蘇), Wong's disciple and a good friend of Sai-wing, Foon and Chun-yee. He is not very talented in martial arts, but is smart and very loyal.
Yeung Chak-lam as Tuen Pa-tin (段霸天), the assistant of General Lau who schemes with the French to sell his country. He is Nap-lan's martial arts mentor and uses him to accomplish his scheme.
Mo-Lin Yu
Law Chun-piu
Ko Miu-sze as Lam Sai-yuk (林世玉), Sai-wing's blind elder sister who initially disapproves her brother practicing martial arts due to their father's death but eventually decides to let him pursue his passions.
Lai Pik-kwong
Joseph Lee as Wong Chun-yee (黃俊義), the son of Wong Fei-hung and good friends with Sai-wing, Foon and So. He is impulsive and often gets into trouble which his father resolves.
Mak Chi-wan as a disciple of Shek.
Yu Tin-wai as a disciple of Shek.
Tang Yu-chiu
Chan Yau-hau as Uncle Kwai (貴叔), Foon's uncle who is a paper crafter and suffers from hard of hearing.
Lau Suk-yee as Chan Ying (陳英), the owner of the Zhizha shop where Uncle Kwai works. She is initially displeased with Foon and often bickers with him, but they later become a couple.
Chu Kong
Kwan Kin
Ho Kwai-lam
Chu Tit-wo as Shek Chun-ngok (石震岳), Wong's rival who is a martial arts master and owner of Chun Wai Martial Arts Studio (震威武館) and often provokes Wong and his disciples. He is also Tuen's nephew and assists his uncle in his treason scheme.
Tsui Kwong-lam as Pighead Wai (豬頭威), Sai-wing's friend who is a fellow meat butcher and martial artist known as the "Street Market King Boxer" (街市拳王).
Ma Hing-sang
Fong Wai-ming
Ling Lai-man
Shek Chung-yuk
Au Ngok
Cho Chai
Lee To-yeung
Tam Yat-ching
Shek Ngai-wan
Cheung Man-kwong
Ng Pok-kwan
Ng Wai-san
Cheng Fan-sang
Lo Kwok-wai
Leung Siu-chau
Leung Hung
Leung Kit-fong
Lo Lai-kuen
Pak Lan
Sheung-kwun Yuk as Mrs. Au-yeung (歐陽夫人), née Lam (林), Ching-ching's mother who disapproves her daughter's relationship with Sai-wing due to the latter's low social status.
Chan On-ying as Lan (阿蘭), Ching-ching's loyal maid who fancies So 
Pui Wan
Chan Ka-pik
Chun Hung
Lee Wan-kwong
Cheung Chi-keung
Kwan Cheuk-yuen
Bak Man-biu
Chan Chung-kin
Suen Kwai-hing
Ho Kwong-lun
Fok Kit-ching
Hui Yat-wah
Amy Hu
Ma Wai-ling
Wong Chi-wai
Carrie Ng
Mui Lan
Chan Ka-yin
Ng Yip-kwong
Felix Lok as a doctor who treats Ching-ching.
Tam Chuen-hing as Luk Ching-kong (陸正剛), Wong's eldest disciple.
Tony Leung
Wong Chung-chi
Ho Pik-kin
Lau Wai-hoi
Wong Cho-see
Hung Tung-leung
Tsang Cho-lam
Lai Siu-fong
Leung Chi-wah
Yip Lai-ha
Chan Tik-hak as Master Hung (雄少), a powerful and feared criminal boss in Hong Kong.
Poon Wai-leung
Ho Lai-nam
Danny Poon
Lam Man-wai
Yu Ming
Chi Pui-fan
Chan Yuk-lun
Yeung Chi-to
Lau Kwok-sing
Mak Ho-wai as a soldier under General Lau Wing-fuk.
Kong Chi-sam
Fung Kwok
Chu Pik-man
Wong Hoi-kwan
Antonio Bastos Tony
Chan Yiu-keung
Fong Chau
Wong To-lam
Tsui Kwok-keung

See also
Andy Lau filmography
Wong Fei-hung filmography

References

External links
Official website
The Return of Wong Fei Hung at Hong Kong Cinemagic

Hong Kong television series
TVB dramas
Hong Kong action television series
Martial arts television series
Period television series
1984 Hong Kong television series debuts
1984 Hong Kong television series endings
1980s Hong Kong television series
Cantonese-language television shows
Television shows set in Hong Kong
Television shows set in Guangdong